Cutrone is a surname. Notable people with the surname include:

Angela Cutrone (born 1969), Canadian speed skater
Kelly Cutrone (born 1965), American fashion publicist, television personality and writer
Ronnie Cutrone (1948–2013), American artist
Patrick Cutrone (born 1998), Italian footballer who plays for Empoli